Aagaardfjellet is a mountain in Sabine Land at Spitsbergen, Svalbard. It is named after Norwegian businessperson Andreas Zacharias Aagaard (1847-1925). The mountain has a height of 684 m.a.s.l., and is situated north of the glacier of Hayesbreen, and west of the bay of Wichebukta.

See also
Aagaardtoppen

References

Mountains of Spitsbergen